Annoru Ravil is a 1986 Indian Malayalam film, directed and produced by M. R. Joseph. The film stars Jagathy Sreekumar, Ratheesh, Nahas and Sukumaran in the lead roles. The film has musical score by Raveendran.

Cast

Jagathy Sreekumar as Vicky
Ratheesh as Venu
Nahas
Sukumaran as Indrajith
Anuradha
Chithra
Devisree
Kuthiravattam Pappu as Antony Nair
Lalithasree
Ranipadmini
Silk Smitha
T. G. Ravi
 Usha
Thodupuzha Radhakrishnan

Soundtrack
The music was composed by Raveendran and the lyrics were written by Mankombu Gopalakrishnan.

References

External links
 

1986 films
1980s Malayalam-language films